Noor Hadi is an Indonesian footballer who plays for Barito Putera in the Indonesia Super League as a striker.

References

Indonesian footballers
Living people
1984 births
Association football forwards
Persijap Jepara players
People from Jepara
Sportspeople from Central Java